Sancergues is a commune in the Cher department in the Centre-Val de Loire region, France.

Geography
The commune is on the ancient pilgrimage route known as St. James' Way and lies on the left bank of the Vauvise, which forms most of the commune's eastern border.

Population

Sights 
 The church of St. Jacques and St. Cyr, dating from the twelfth century.
 A feudal motte at Augy.
 Augy chateau, home of Nobel laureate Roger Martin du Gard for 27 years.

See also
Communes of the Cher department

References

External links

Official Sancergues website 

Communes of Cher (department)